Diego Hernán González (born 9 February 1988, in Buenos Aires), also known as "Pulpo" González, is an Argentine professional footballer who plays as a midfielder for Boca Juniors in the Argentine Primera División.

Career

Gonzalez made his first team debut for Lanús during the Apertura 2007 tournament, which the club went on to win.

In 2010, he joined Rosario Central, recently relegated to the second division. He returned to Lanús for the second half of the season.

In 4 December 2014 it was announced that he sign a contract with Club Santos Laguna who plays in la Liga MX. He will make his debut in the Torneo Clausura Mexico 2015

Honours
Lanús
 Primera División Argentina: Apertura 2007
 Copa Sudamericana: 2013

Santos Laguna
 Liga MX: Clausura 2015
 Campeón de Campeones: 2015

Boca Juniors
Primera División: 2022
 Copa Argentina: 2019–20
 Copa de la Liga Profesional: 2020, 2022
 Supercopa Argentina: 2022

References

External links

 Argentine Primera statistics
 Player profile on the Lanús website
 Football-Lineups player profile

1988 births
Living people
Footballers from Buenos Aires
Argentine footballers
Association football midfielders
Club Atlético Lanús footballers
Racing Club de Avellaneda footballers
Rosario Central footballers
Boca Juniors footballers
Santos Laguna footballers
Club Tijuana footballers
Argentine Primera División players
Primera Nacional players
Liga MX players
Argentine expatriate footballers
Expatriate footballers in Mexico